Ivo Caprino (17 February 1920 – 8 February 2001) was a Norwegian film director and writer, best known for his puppet films. His most noted film, Flåklypa Grand Prix ("Pinchcliffe Grand Prix"), was made in 1975.

Early life
Caprino was born 17 February 1920 in Oslo, the son of Italian furniture designer Mario Caprino and the artist, Ingeborg "Ingse" Caprino nee Gude, who was a granddaughter of the painter Hans Gude.  Ingse Gude was a watercolorist, illustrator, puppet maker, and author, born in Oybin, Saxony.  The Caprinos divorced around 1927, and Ingse married the painter Bernhard Folkestad.  After his death, she lived with the painter and art critic, Pola Gauguin.

Early career

In the mid-1940s, Caprino helped his mother design puppets for a puppet theatre, which inspired him to try making a film using his mother's designs.  Ivo used the surplus puppets as inspiration for his first animated film, Tim and Tøffe (1948), the result of their collaboration.  The eight minute film, however, was not released until 1949.  Several other films followed, including two 15-minute shorts that are still shown regularly in Norway, Veslefrikk med Fela (Little Freddy and his Fiddle), based on a Norwegian folk tale; and Karius og Baktus, a story by Thorbjørn Egner of two little trolls—representing caries and bacterium—living in a boy's teeth.  Gude made the puppets for these films as well.

Work with Ingse Caprino
Following the success of Tim og Tøffe, Gude was involved in all of her son's films until 1963.  Gude made some puppets for a production by Frithjof Tidemand-Johannessen.  Caprino had set up a film studio in the manor house, and Gude started working full-time on new puppets, which often had luscious proportions. The film, Veslefrikk med Fela, was awarded the best children's film at the 13th Venice International Film Festival in 1952. The commissioned production, Den steadhaftige tinnsoldat (The Steadfast Tin Soldier), won several international awards.  

Gude filled the role of cinematographer on the last film collaboration with her son.  The puppet's voice role being played by Liv Strømsted.  Gude died 9 December 1963 at Snarøya.  The production of puppets was afterwards taken over by her granddaughter Ivonne Caprino.

Innovations
When making Tim og Tøffe, Caprino invented a method for controlling the puppet's movements in real time. The technique can be described as a primitive, mechanical version of animatronics.  Caprino's films received good reviews, and he quickly became a celebrity in Norway. When he switched to traditional stop motion film-making, Caprino tried to maintain the impression that he was still using some kind of "magic" technology to make the puppets move, even though all his later films were made with traditional stop motion techniques.  Another innovative method used by the team, was the use of condoms for the creation of the puppets' facial skin.

In addition to the short films, Caprino produced dozens of advertising films with puppets. In 1959, he directed a live action feature film, Ugler i Mosen, which also contained stop motion sequences. He then made a feature film about Peter Christen Asbjørnsen, who had travelled around Norway in the 19th century collecting traditional folk tales.  The plan was to use live action for the sequences showing Asbjørnsen, and then to realise the folk tales using stop motion.  Unfortunately, Caprino was unable to secure funding for the project, so he ended up making the planned folk tale sequences as separate 16-minute puppet films, book-ended by live action sequences showing Asbjørnsen.

The Pinchcliffe Grand Prix
In 1970, Caprino and his small team of collaborators, started work on a 25-minute TV special, which eventually became The Pinchcliffe Grand Prix.  Based on a series of books by Norwegian cartoonist and author, Kjell Aukrust, it featured a group of eccentric characters all living in the small village of Pinchcliffe.  The TV special was a collection of sketches based on Aukrust's books, with no real story line.  After 1.5 years of work, it was decided that it didn't really work as a whole, so production on the TV special was stopped (except for some very short clips, no material from it has ever been seen by the public), and Caprino and Aukrust instead wrote a screenplay for a feature film using the characters and environments that had already been built.

The result was The Pinchcliffe Grand Prix, which stars Theodore Rimspoke (No. Reodor Felgen) and his two assistants, Sonny Duckworth (No. Solan Gundersen), a cheerful and optimistic bird, and Lambert (No. Ludvig), a nervous, pessimistic and melancholic hedgehog.  Theodore works as a bicycle repairman, though he spends most of his time inventing weird Rube Goldberg-like contraptions.  One day, the trio discover that one of Theodore's former assistants, Rudolph Gore-Slimey, has stolen his design for a race car engine, and has become a world champion Formula One driver.  Sonny secures funding from an Arab oil sheik who happens to be vacationing in Pinchcliffe, and the trio then build a gigantic racing car, Il Tempo Gigante—a fabulous construction with two engines, radar, and its own blood bank.  Theodore then enters a race, and ends up winning, beating Gore-Slimey despite his attempts at sabotage.

The film was made in 3.5 years by a team of five people. Caprino directed and animated.  Bjarne Sandemose (Caprino's principal collaborator throughout his career) built the sets and the cars, and was in charge of the technical side.  Ingeborg Riiser modeled the puppets and Gerd Alfsen made the costumes and props.  When it came out in 1975, The movie was a large success in Norway, selling one million tickets in its first year of release.  It remains the biggest box office hit of all time in Norway.  Caprino Studios claims it has sold 5.5 million tickets to date.

To help promote the film abroad, Caprino and Sandemose built a full-scale replica of Il Tempo Gigante that is legal for public roads, but is usually exhibited at Hunderfossen Familiepark.

Later career
Except for some TV work in the late 1970s, Caprino made no more puppet films, focusing instead on creating attractions for the Hunderfossen theme park outside Lillehammer based on his folk tale movies, and making tourist films using a custom built multi camera setup of his own design that shoots 280 degrees panorama movies.

Death and afterwards 
Caprino was born and died in Oslo, but lived all of his life at Snarøya, Bærum.  He died in 2001 after having lived several years with cancer.  Since Caprino's death, his son Remo has had moderate success developing a computer game based on Flåklypa Grand Prix.

Filmography 

 1975 – Flåklypa Grand Prix
 1967 – Gutten som kappåt med trollet
 1966 – Sjuende far i huset
 1963 – Papirdragen
 1962 – Reveenka
 1961 – Askeladden og de gode hjelperne
 1959 – Ugler i mosen
 1958 – Et hundeliv med meg
 1955 – Den standhaftige tinnsoldat
 1955 – Klatremus i knipe
 1954 – Karius og Baktus
 1952 – Veslefrikk med fela
 1950 – Musikk på loftet/En dukkedrøm
 1949 – Tim og Tøffe

See also
Ivo Caprinos Supervideograf

References

External links 
  Caprino Studios – Official page
 

1920 births
2001 deaths
Deaths from cancer in Norway
Stop motion animators
Norwegian animated film directors
Norwegian film editors
Norwegian animators
Norwegian puppeteers
Norwegian people of Italian descent
People from Bærum